The Moreland Terrace Historic District is a historic district roughly bounded by Moreland Terrace, Ash, Bedford, and Page Streets in New Bedford, Massachusetts.  It is a residential area that was developed in the early-to-mid 20th century, and is characterized by larger lot sizes and a higher quality of housing than surrounding areas.  Most of the houses are Colonial Revival in style, with a few examples of earlier styles (Georgian Revival, Queen Anne), as well as a few later ranch-style houses.

The district was added to the National Register of Historic Places in 1996.

See also
National Register of Historic Places listings in New Bedford, Massachusetts

References

Historic districts in Bristol County, Massachusetts
Colonial Revival architecture in Massachusetts
Shingle Style architecture in Massachusetts
National Register of Historic Places in New Bedford, Massachusetts
New Bedford, Massachusetts
Historic districts on the National Register of Historic Places in Massachusetts